Francisco Olmos Hernández (born July 10, 1970), usually known as Paco Olmos, is a Spanish professional basketball coach, who is currently the head coach of the San Pablo Burgos of the Spanish LEB Oro.

Coaching career
Olmos coached inferior teams of Valencia BC until 1997, when he signed for CB Calpe of the EBA League. In 1999 he made his debut in the second Spanish division LEB League with CB Inca; in the following year he continued in the same division, signing for CB Ciudad de Huelva (2000–01) and for CB Los Barrios (2001–2002).

After that, Olmos signed for Pamesa Valencia of ACB League, where he stayed during two years and achieved the best results of the club history: finalist of the 2002–2003 ACB League and 2002–03 ULEB Cup champions.

In June 2005 he became the coach of the Spain national under-20 basketball team. Then he return to the LEB again, first coaching Aguas de Calpe (2005–2006), then Club Melilla Baloncesto (2006–2008) and afterwards, in July 2009, he became head coach of Menorca Basquet, reaching the second position in the regular league and winning the 2010 LEB Playoff, thus promoting the team to the ACB League.

On July 18, 2013 was named national coach of the Puerto Rico Men's National Basketball Team to form the template that will participate in the qualifying tournament "Pre-World" FIBA to be held in Caracas, Venezuela from August 30, 2013.

In 2016, Olmos signs with Vaqueros de Bayamón.

After ending the season with the Venezuelan squad, he signed for Mexican Fuerza Regia. In his first season at the helm of the squad from Monterrey, Olmos ended as champion of the National League.

On January 10, 2022, he has signed with San Pablo Burgos of the Liga ACB.

Titles & awards

Titles
National competitions:
 1 LNBP with Fuerza Regia: 2016–17
 1 LEB Playoffs and promotion with Menorca Basquet: 2009–10.

International competitions:
  1 ULEB Cup with Pamesa Valencia : 2002–03.

Awards
 AEEB Coach of the Year: 2002–03.

References

External links
ACB Profile
 http://www.primerahora.com/deportes/baloncesto/nota/calientamotoreslaseleccion-938019/
 http://www.elnuevodia.com/pacoolmosseraelnuevodirigentedelaseleccionnacionaldebaloncesto-1554401.html

1970 births
Living people
Liga ACB head coaches
CB Miraflores coaches
Menorca Bàsquet coaches
Spanish basketball coaches
Valencia Basket coaches